The Preston strike of 1853–1854 was a strike of English weavers which took place between 1853 and 1854 in Preston, Lancashire.

The strike lasted seven months and paralyzed the cotton industry in the city of Preston. The primary leaders were George Cowell and Mortimer Grimshaw.

It inspired two contemporary novelists. Charles Dickens spent several days in Preston in January 1854. Although he does not describe a strike in Hard Times, whose publication began in April 1854 in Household Words, he was inspired by Mortimer Grimshaw in creating the character of the union leader, Slackbridge, and the intransigence of the bosses inspired the character of Bounderby. Elizabeth Gaskell, in North and South, was inspired by the Preston strike in depicting one that takes place in Manchester in her novel.

See also
 Preston Strike of 1842

References

Labour disputes in England
1850s labor disputes and strikes
Textile and clothing strikes
Preston, Lancashire
1853 in England
1854 in England